Dorinne K. Kondo is a professor of American studies and Ethnicity and Anthropology at the University of Southern California. She is a scholar, playwright, and has over 20 years of work experience in dramaturge; her work shows the structural inequality of race and ethnicities in the world of contemporary theatre. Her creative performances are shedding light on racism and power in the theatre industry but her work mostly focuses on discrimination and racism towards Asians, which makes a link to art and politics. Kondo's writings discuss issues on power, gender inequality, the discourses in a Japanese workplace, and racism in the fashion industry. She is an activist against racism in America as she has openly discussed and teaches about racism and inequality of the sexes as she thinks that there is a chance for social transformation.

Kondo has suffered a health incident where she had a cardiac problem when one of her valves were leaking therefore her book launch for Worldmaking: Race, Performance and the Work of Creativity, was postponed three years due to her open-heart surgery.

Education 
Dorinne Kondo's education was fully focalized on Anthropology. As Kondo has received her Bachelor of Anthropology from Stanford University in 1975. Then she continued her studies by taking her Masters in Anthropology in Harvard University in 1978. She then obtained her Ph.D. in Anthropology in Harvard University in 1982. Dorinne Kondo has specialized in research after finishing her Ph.D. at Harvard University. She practiced research and taught as an Assistant Professor of Anthropology in Harvard University 1982. Her research was on race and power, performance studies, theories of subject, and cultural theory.

Degrees 

 Ph.D., Department of Anthropology, Harvard University, 1982
M.A., Department of Anthropology, Harvard University, 1978
B.A., Phi Beta Kappa, Departmental Honors, Distinction, Department of Anthropology, Stanford University, 1975

Dorinne Kondo had multiple postdoctoral training from (1987-2002), such as in:

 Fellow, University of California, Irvine Humanities Research Institute, Spring 2002 
 Research Fellow, Getty Research Institute, 2000-2001 
 Institute of American Cultures Postdoctoral Fellow, UCLA, 1993-1994 
 Fellow, University of California, Irvine Humanities Research Institute, Fall 1993 
 Rockefeller Fellow, Rice University, 1989-1990 
 Rockefeller Fellow, The Institute for Advanced Study, Princeton, NJ, 1987-1988

Career 
Kondo's is a professor and she has started her career as being an Assistant Professor of Anthropology in Harvard University for seven years from 1982 to 1989. Then she became a MacArthur Associate Professor of Women's Studies and Anthropology, later on she was appointed to be a Full Professor in 1997 at Pomona College. She is now a Professor of Anthropology and American Studies and Ethnicity at the University of Southern California and she has been at the University of Southern California since 1997.

Her career mainly focused on gender studies and ethnology as she has now portrayed her knowledge on discrimination and gender inequality in her dramaturge and playwright. Kondo's art works, which are her playwrights that she has written, have been shedding light on the discrimination on Asians in the theatre and fashion world. Kondo has mentioned multiple times on social media that what has happened in the past cannot be changed but with raising awareness using her playwrights, she thinks there is a chance for social change and to progressively end inequality.

In her creative and innovative book Worldmaking: Race, Performance and the Work of Creativity, Dorinne Kondo guesses the racialized constructions of imbalance that pervade theater and the arts. Grounded in twenty years of hands on work as dramaturge and writer, Kondo activates critical race researches, influence hypothesis, analysis, and emotional composition to abrasively break down performance center's work of inventiveness as hypothesis: acting, writing, and dramaturgy. Race-making happens behind the stage in the imaginative cycle and through economic forces, institutional hierarchy, recruiting practices, philosophies of creative greatness, and tasteful structure. For the audience, expressions of the arts produce racial effect fundamentally over-determined ways influence can enhance or diminish life. Overturning class through insightful understanding, distinctive vignettes, and Kondo's unique play, worldmaking ventures from an underlying sentiment with theater that is broken by experiences with prejudice, toward what Kondo calls reparative inventiveness. Worldmaking plays out the potential for expressions of the arts to change worlds, from theater worlds to psychic worlds to worldmaking dreams for social change.

Her other book About face analyzes representations of Asia and their resonations in both Asia and Asian American lives. Japanese high fashion and Asian American theater become points of passage into the political issues of pleasure, the presentation of racial personalities, the possibility of political intervention in commodity capitalism. In view of Kondo's hands on work, this interdisciplinary work unites papers, interviews with fashioner Rei Kawakubo of Comme des Garçons and dramatist David Henry Hwang, and "individual" vignettes in its investigation of counter-orientalism.

Paul H. Noguchi an American Anthropologist commented on Kondo's book Crafting sleeves:

"The ethnography of Japan is currently being reshaped by a new generation of Japanologists, and the present work certainly deserves a place in this body of literature. . . . The combination of utility with beauty makes Kondo’s book required reading, for those with an interest not only in Japan but also in reflexive anthropology, women’s studies, field methods, the anthropology of work, social psychology, Asian Americans, and even modern literature."

Work 
Dorinne Kondo has worked on funded researches such as:

 Creative Differences; The Cultural Politics of Race in American Theater (Stanford Humanities Center), Dorinne Kondo, $60,000, 2013-2014 
 Advancing Scholarship in the Humanities and Social Sciences Mentorship (University of Southern California), Dorinne Kondo, $1,000, 2012

Books 

 Kondo, D. K. (2018). Worldmaking: Race, Performance and the Work of Creativity. Durham, NC: Duke University Press. 
 Kondo, D. K. (1997). About face: performing race in fashion and theater, 1997.
 Kondo, D. K. (1990). Crafting Selves: Power, Gender and Discourses of Identity in a Japanese Workplace, 1990.

References

External links
University of Southern California page on Dorinne K. Kondo

Living people
University of Southern California faculty
American orientalists
Social anthropologists
Symbolic anthropologists
Psychological anthropologists
Place of birth missing (living people)
Year of birth missing (living people)
American women anthropologists
Harvard University alumni
Stanford University alumni
Anthropology educators
American writers of Japanese descent
American academics of Japanese descent
Women orientalists
American women academics
21st-century American women